Actinoplanes friuliensis is a species of bacteria that produces lipopeptide antibiotics with peptidoglycan synthesis-inhibiting activity, called friulimicins.

References

Further reading

External links

LPSN
Type strain of Actinoplanes friuliensis at BacDive -  the Bacterial Diversity Metadatabase

Micromonosporaceae
Bacteria described in 2001